Sumit Kumar (born 11 May 1997) is an Indian professional field hockey player who plays as a Forward. He is in the Indian squad at the 2014 Sultan of Johor Cup.

References

External links 

1997 births
Living people
Field hockey players from Uttar Pradesh
Indian male field hockey players
Male field hockey forwards